Tage Rita is an agricultural engineer from Ziro Valley and is India's first kiwi wine brewer. In 2018, she was honored with the Women Transforming India Awards, organized by the United Nations and NITI Aayog.

Early life and education 
Tage Rita Takhe was born in the Ziro Valley in Arunachal Pradesh. She belongs to the Apatani tribe.
She studied and was trained as an agricultural engineer from NERIST ( North Eastern Regional Institute of Science and Technology ), Nirjuli, Arunachal Pradesh.

Career 
In 2017, Rita invested in a boutique winery - Naara Aaba. In doing so, she also found the solution to a local problem. She would brew wine from Kiwi, a fruit that was found in abundance in the valley where she lived. She sourced the organic fruit from her orchard and the Kiwi Growers Cooperative Society in Arunachal Pradesh. The farming sector gained assured buyers. Her winemaking process follows traditional methods. It took her six years of research and planning to prepare the right procedure and the correct concoction. The winery has scaled its capacity since 2017 from 20,000 litres to 60,000 litres of wine production currently through 16 tanks. The first year of wine production alone supported 300 farmers and brought them back to the kiwi orchards, as they sold around 20 metric tons(20,000 kg) of kiwis to the winery. The process takes about four months from crushing the raw material to bottling. The wine tastes best between six and eight degrees Celsius.

Awards and recognition 
On International Women's Day 2022, she received the 2020 Nari Shakti Puraskar from President Ram Nath Kovind. The award is organised annually by the Ministry of Women and Child Development to recognise the women who create or inspire change. The ceremony had been postponed because of the COVID-19 pandemic and the ceremony included 72 women vaccinators who had excelled in their work.

 North East Entrepreneur Award
 Winner of the Women Transforming India Awards 2018, organized by the United Nations and NITI Aayog
 Women Transforming India Awards 2018by NITI AAYOG in Collaboration with United Nations. 
 Felicitation and Citationby Hon’ble Governor of Arunachal Pradesh, Brig. Dr. B.D. Mishra (Retd) on 26thOct’2018  
 Recipient of Vasundhara Awardfrom Sreemanta Sankara Mission (SSM)Guwahati-2017  
 Awarded a pioneer women entrepreneur of Ziro, Lower Subansiri District of Arunachal Pradesh by Helping Hands, a Delhi based NGO headed by Shri Robin Hibu (IPS), 2017.  
 Awarded Innovative Entrepreneur- 2017by SMILE  ZIRO, a renowned NGO of Ziro valley.  
 Felicitation of and Certificate of Appriciation-2020by Department of Women and Child Development, Govt. of Arunachal Pradesh.  
 CNBC-18(A TV Channel with world wide viewership) made a short story for the International Womens Day 2019 for special telecast.   Certificate of Appreciationby Bharatiya Janata Yuva Morcha, 2020.  
 AYA Award-2018 by Apatani youth Association - This is a 40 years old youth organization of Ziro Valley.  
 ANNYO Award-2019by a village based youth organization which works towards social harmony and protection of wild life.   
 Nominated for 13thNational Women Excellence Award-2020by Indo European Chamber of Commerce.

References 

Living people
Year of birth missing (living people)
Indian women
Nari Shakti Puraskar winners
Winemakers
Kiwifruit